= Fantasy Land (board game) =

1981 board game published by Lange Games

Fantasy Land is a 1981 board game designed by Gary Lange and published by Lange Games.

== Gameplay ==
Player characters are transported to Fantasyland where they compete in World War I aerial dogfights, magical duels, gunfights, jousts, space battles, and gladiatorial contests.

== Reception ==
In Issue 45 of The Space Gamer, Paul O'Connor was not enamored of this game, saying every game ended in "near-fatal boredom. Each game consists of a mindless exercise of rolling dice against a non-player opponent, providing little or no chance to execute any sort of strategy." O'Connor commented that the premise was an interesting idea, but "this game ranges from inane to merely ridiculous. The artwork, if it can be called such, is horrible, showing absolutely no artistic talent whatsoever." O'Connor concluded, "Fantasy Land is an absolute disaster at any price. If you see this turkey in a store, draw a gun and shoot it."
